The Williams FW34 was a Formula One racing car designed by Williams F1 for the 2012 Formula One season.

Design 
Following their worst season in their thirty-year history—in which they finished ninth in the World Constructors' Championship with just five points—the team underwent a technical review, employing former McLaren designer Mike Coughlan (having served his suspension for his role in the 2007 Formula One espionage controversy) as Chief Designer, and promoting Jason Somerville to Head of Aerodynamics. 

The FW34 used the Renault RS27-2012 engine; the team had previously used Renault engines between 1989 and 1997. The car, which was launched on the 7 February 2012, was driven by Pastor Maldonado and Bruno Senna.

Racing history 
At the 2012 Spanish Grand Prix, Maldonado drove the FW34 to pole position and converted it to victory the next day. As well as being Maldonado's maiden Formula One win, it was also the first for Williams since the 2004 Brazilian Grand Prix, which was won by Juan Pablo Montoya in the FW26, and still currently the last as of January 2023.

Gallery

Complete Formula One results
(key) (results in bold indicate pole position; results in italics indicate fastest lap)

 Driver failed to finish the race, but was classified as they had completed greater than 90% of the race distance.

References

External links

Williams Formula One cars